Erkan Geniş (born February 2, 1943) is a famous Turkish impressionist artist, who has been accepted as one of the Greatest 100 Turkish Painters who Ever Lived, announced by the Ministry of Culture of Turkey.

He was born on February 2, 1943, in Bartın, Turkey.

While studying at the Kabataş Erkek Lisesi in Istanbul, his art instructor Ahmet Uzelli, who is also a widely acclaimed artist, was the first to discover his artistic skills. During his college level studies at the Political Science Faculty of Ankara and the succeeding years when he served to Republic of Turkey as a high ranked bureaucrat, he worked at the same studio with his special instructors, Saim Kanra and Hikmet Onat.

Following his retirement as the General Manager of Turkish Machine Industries, he established his own art studio in Ankara, where he is still working and training dozens of new students every year. He is married, has two children and one grand daughter.

External links
 Erkan Geniş Website

1943 births
Living people
Turkish Impressionist painters